VeggieTales in the House premiered on November 26, 2014, when the first five episodes were released. The next five episodes were released on January 30, 2015, with the last five episodes released on April 17, 2015. Season 2 was released on September 25, 2015. Season 3 premiered on March 25, 2016. Season 4 premiered on September 23, 2016. A follow-up series, titled VeggieTales in the City, premiered on February 24, 2017, on Netflix.

Series overview

Episodes

Season 1 (2014–15)

Season 2 (2015)

Season 3 (2016)

Season 4 (2016)

References

Lists of American children's animated television series episodes
VeggieTales